Real Betis Balompié, known as Real Betis or just Betis, is a Spanish professional football club based in Seville in the autonomous community of Andalusia. Founded in 1907, it plays in La Liga. It holds home games at the Estadio Benito Villamarín in the south of the city with a 60,720-seat capacity.

Real Betis won the league title in 1935 and the Copa del Rey in 1977, 2005 and 2022. Given the club's tumultuous history and many relegations, its motto is ¡Viva el Betis manque (aunque) pierda! ("Long live Betis even if they lose!").

History
The name "Betis" is derived from Baetis, the Roman name for the Guadalquivir river which passes through Seville and which the Roman province there was named after. Real ('Royal') was added in 1914 after the club received patronage from King Alfonso XIII.

Foundation

Betis' city rivals Sevilla FC were the first club in Sevilla, founded in October 1905, while a second club, España Balompié were established in September 1907. "Balompié" translates literally as "football", as opposed to the most commonly adopted anglicised version, "fútbol". Balompié was founded by students from the local Polytechnic Academy, and were in operation for one year before being officially recognised (in 1909) as Sevilla Balompié; despite this, 1907 remains the official foundation date of the club.

Following an internal split from Sevilla FC, another club was formed, Betis Football Club. In 1914, they merged with Sevilla Balompié. The club received its royal patronage in the same year, and therefore adopted the name Real Betis Balompié. Fans continued to refer to the club as Balompié and were themselves known as Los Balompedistas until the 1930s, when Betis and the adjective Béticos became common terminology when discussing the club and its followers.

Real Betis originally played in all blue jerseys and white shorts, for no other reason than the easy availability of such plain colours. But one of the founders and captain, Manuel Ramos Asensio, was keen to take advantage of his relationships made while studying in Scotland, contacted Celtic (whose green and white colours matched the Andalusian regional flag) and obtained the same fabric to make kits for his own club. Ramos had the lines re-orientated from horizontal 'hoops' into vertical stripes to make the shirts (no other Spanish club used the combination at the time). There is no mention of Celtic or Scotland in the history of Betis on the club's official website, but in 2017 the club officially acknowledged the link by producing a special hooped kit to coincide with Andalusia Day. The blue colour is still often used in away kit designs.

1930s: promotion, championship and relegation
During the Spanish Second Republic (1931–1939), royal patronage of all organisations was nullified, and thus the club was known as Betis Balompié until after the Spanish Civil War when it would revert to the full name. The club reached the Copa del Presidente de la República final for the first time on 21 June 1931, when it lost 3–1 to Athletic Bilbao in Madrid. Betis marked their 25th anniversary year by winning their first Segunda División title in 1932, finishing two points ahead of Oviedo FC, thus becoming the first club from Andalusia to play in La Liga.

Under the guidance of Irish coach Patrick O'Connell on 28 April 1935 Betis won the La Liga, to date their only top division title. They topped the table by a single point over Madrid FC. A year later Betis went down to seventh. This was due to the dismantling of the championship-winning team because of the club's poor economic situation and the arrival of the Civil War, meaning that just 15 months after winning the league title only two players who won in 1935 were left: Peral and Saro. No official league was held during the Civil War between 1936 and 1939, until its resumption for the 1939–40 season and the first year back highlighted Betis' decline as exactly five years after winning the title the club was relegated.

Darkest period
Despite a brief return to the top division which lasted only one season, the club continued to decline and in 1947 the worst fears were reached when they were relegated to Tercera División. Many fans see the ten years they spent in the category as key to the "identity" and "soul" of the club. During this time, Betis earned a reputation for filling its stadium and having a massive support at away matches, known as the "Green March".

When the side returned to the second level in 1954, it gained the distinction of being the only club in Spain to have won all three major divisions' titles. Much of the credit for guiding Betis through this dark period and back into the Segunda lies with chairman Manuel Ruiz Rodríguez.

Benito Villamarín
In 1955, Manuel Ruiz Rodríguez stepped down from running the club believing he could not offer further economic growth, he was replaced by Betis most famous former president, Benito Villamarín. During his reign Betis returned to the top division in 1958–59 and finished in third place in 1964. His purchase of the Estadio Heliópolis in 1961 is seen as a key point in the history of the club – the grounds were called the Estadio Benito Villamarín until 1997. In 1965, Villamarín stepped down from his position after ten years at the helm of the club.

Just one year after Villamarín's departure, the club would again be relegated to division two, then rising and falling almost consecutively until consolidating their place in the top level in 1974–75.

First Copa del Rey Title and European Qualification

On 25 June 1977, Betis played Athletic Bilbao at the Vicente Calderón Stadium in the Copa del Rey final. The match finished 2–2, with Betis winning 8–7 after a staggering 21 penalties taken. This rounded off a solid season in which the club finished fifth in the league.

After that triumph, Betis competed in the European Cup Winners' Cup: after knocking out Milan 3–2 on aggregate in the first round, the side reached the quarter-finals, where they lost to Dynamo Moscow. Despite their strong performance in Europe, the team suffered league relegation.

The following year, Betis returned to the top flight and ushered in a period of "good times" for the club, with the next three seasons seeing three top-six finishes, as well as UEFA Cup qualification in 1982 and 1984.

During the summer of 1982, the Benito Villamarín hosted two matches as part of the 1982 FIFA World Cup, and also witnessed the Spain national team's famous 12–1 hammering of Malta to qualify for UEFA Euro 1984.

Economic crisis and Manuel Ruiz de Lopera

In 1992, Betis found itself subject to new league rules and regulations due to its restructuring as an autonomous sporting group (SAD), requiring the club to come up with 1,200 million pesetas, roughly double that of all the first and second division teams, despite being in level two at the time.

In just three months, the fans raised 400 million pesetas with then vice-president Manuel Ruiz de Lopera stepping in to provide an economic guarantee while himself becoming majority shareholder as the team narrowly avoided relegation.

On 11 September 1994, Real Betis played its 1,000th game in La Liga.

Serra Ferrer success
After another three seasons in the second division, with the club managed by Lorenzo Serra Ferrer, Betis returned to the top flight for the 1994–95 season, subsequently achieving a final third position, thus qualifying to the UEFA Cup.In the European campaign, Betis knocked out Fenerbahçe (4–1 on aggregate) and 1. FC Kaiserslautern (4–1) before losing to defeated finalists Bordeaux (3–2). In 1997, 20 years after winning the trophy for the first time, the club returned to the final of the Copa del Rey – again held in Madrid, although this time at the Santiago Bernabéu Stadium – losing 2–3 against Barcelona after extra time.

Incidentally, Barça was the club Serra Ferrer would leave Betis for that summer, to be replaced by former player Luis Aragonés. Aragonés would only last one season with the club, leading the side to the eighth position and to the quarter-finals in the Cup Winners' Cup, where they would lose 2–5 on aggregate to eventual winners Chelsea.

Aragonés was followed by the controversial reign of Javier Clemente, who spat on a fan and implied Andalusia was "another country!". The team slipped down the table, finishing 11th and being knocked out of the UEFA Cup by Bologna in the third round. For the next couple of seasons, Betis went through numerous managers, a relegation and a promotion, after which the team finished sixth in the league with Juande Ramos at the helm.

Ramos was gone after just one season, however, being replaced by former Cup Winners' Cup-winning manager Víctor Fernández. He led the team to eighth and ninth in the league and the third round of the 2002–03 UEFA Cup, being knocked out by Auxerre (1–2 on aggregate), during his two-year reign.

For 2004, Fernández was replaced by the returning Serra Ferrer, who guided the team to the fourth position in the top flight. They also returned to the Vicente Calderón on June 11, 2005, for the Copa del Rey final, lifting the trophy for only the second time after an extra-time winner by youth graduate Dani in a 2–1 win against Osasuna.

The league finish meant Betis became the first Andalusian team to compete in the UEFA Champions League, and it reached the group stage after disposing of Monaco in the last qualifying round (3–2 on aggregate). Drawn in Group G, and in spite of a 1–0 home win against Chelsea, the club eventually finished third, being "demoted" to the UEFA Cup, where it would be ousted in the round of 16 by Romanian club Steaua București with a 0–3 home loss. Compared to the previous season, the league campaign was disappointing, with the club finishing in 14th place, just three points off the relegation zone.

Centenary celebrations

Betis celebrated their centenary year in 2007. The festivities included a special match against Milan, the reigning European Champions, on August 9, with the hosts winning 1–0 thanks to a Mark González penalty early in the second half. Seven days later, the club won the Ramón de Carranza Trophy held in neighbouring Cádiz, beating Real Zaragoza on penalties in the final, having defeated Real Madrid in the semi-finals.

Surrounding the celebration, it was a time of great change in terms of the playing and technical teams, with eight new signings replacing 14 departures. In the summer of 2006, Serra Ferrer was replaced by Luis Fernandez for the 2006–07 season. However, the two seasons that encompassed the centenary year (2006–07 and 2007–08) were disappointing, with the club having four different managers and barely avoiding relegation in both seasons.

Relegation
After many years of staving off relegation, Betis' 2008–09 season culminated with a 1–1 draw against Real Valladolid at home. As a result, the club finished 18th in the table and consequently was relegated to the second division on goal difference.

On June 15, 2009, over 65,000 Beticos, including icons such as Rafael Gordillo, Del Sol, Hipólito Rincón, Julio Cardeñosa and others, joined the protest march in Sevilla with the slogan "15-J Yo Voy Betis" to let the majority owner Ruiz de Lopera know that it was time to put his 54% share of the club on the market for someone, some entity or the Betis supporters to buy those shares and remove Lopera from the day-to-day operations of the club.

Despite the protests, no upper management changes were made during the season, which would ultimately see Betis fail to gain promotion back to the top level.

Lopera court action and sale
Seville judge Mercedes Alaya was investigating links between Betis and other Ruiz de Lopera-owned businesses, leading to him being formally charged with fraud. On July 7, 2010, one week before the start of preliminary court proceedings, Lopera sold 94% of the shares that he owned (51% of Betis total shares) to Bitton Sport, fronted by Luis Oliver, for the surprisingly low figure of €16 million, leaving Lopera with only minor shares; Oliver had already reportedly taken two football clubs, Cartagena and Xerez, to the brink of bankruptcy.

Before the sale could be officially sanctioned, however, Ayala froze Lopera shareholdings. Left with nothing, despite putting down a €1 million deposit, Oliver hastily bought a nominal number of shares from a third party and was voted onto the board of directors by the existing members (all former cohorts of Lopera), allowing him to carry on running the club. In response to this, the judge appointed well-respected former Betis, Real Madrid and Spain national team legend Rafael Gordillo to administrate Lopera's shares to ensure Lopera was not still running the club and that decisions made were for the benefit of the club not individual board members.

La Liga return

Again under Pepe Mel, Betis started 2011–12 with four wins in as many games, with Rubén Castro retaining his goal scoring form from the previous season, where he scored 27 goals. Betis finished 13th in their first season since returning to La Liga.

In the 2012–13 season, Betis finished seventh in La Liga and qualified for the 2013–14 UEFA Europa League, the first European qualification for the club since the 2005–06 Champions League. This European campaign ended in the quarter-finals after losing on penalties to local rivals Sevilla. Betis were relegated from La Liga with three games still to play in the 2013–14 season, but returned immediately as champions with two games to spare.

Back into UEFA competitions 
In the 2017–18 season, under Quique Setién, Betis finished sixth in La Liga and earned a spot in the Europa League. The 2018–19 campaign was very positive; the club reached the Copa del Rey semi-finals and topped their group in the Europa League, before eventually being knocked out by Stade Rennais in the round of 32.

On April 23rd 2022, Betis won the Copa del Rey final against Valencia after drawing 1-1 after 120 minutes and winning 5-4 on penalties. It was the first trophy after 17 years, since they won their second Copa del Rey on 2005 against Osasuna (2-1).

Seville derby

Betis have a long-standing rivalry with city neighbours Sevilla FC. The two have met 114 times in official competition, with Sevilla holding a 45% win ratio over Betis (31%).

The first match between the two clubs took place on 8 February 1915, with Sevilla winning 4–3. The match was not completed, as high tensions led an aggressive crowd to invade the pitch, forcing the referee to abandon the match.

In 1916, the first Copa Andalucía was held, this being the first official derby of the Sevilla area. Of the 17 runnings of the cup, Sevilla were victorious 14 times, to Betis' one sole conquest; this included a 22–0 routing after the latter sent their youth team, in 1918.

The first time the teams met in league, in Segunda, happened in 1928–29, with both teams winning their home matches (3–0 and 2–1). They played for the first time in the Spanish top division during the 1934–35 season, with a 0–3 home defeat for Sevilla and a 2–2 draw at Betis, with the latter winning the national championship.

On 17 January 1943, Betis lost 5–0 at Sevilla, eventually being relegated. In the first game held at the Ramón Sánchez Pizjuán Stadium, on 21 September 1958, the Verdiblancos won it 4–2.

In later years, several matches were also marred by violence, including: a security guard attacked by a Sevilla fan with a crutch (that he did not require to walk), Betis goalkeeper Toni Prats being attacked and Sevilla manager Juande Ramos being struck by a bottle of water; the latter incident led to the 2007 Copa del Rey match being suspended, being played out three weeks later in Getafe with no spectators.

On February 7, 2009, Betis won 2–1 at the Pizjuán, but was eventually relegated from the top flight, while Sevilla finished in third position.

On November 9, 2019, more than 10,000 Betis fans visited the team training before the last derby in 2019.

Statistics

La Liga

Segunda División

Copa del Rey

History in European competitions

Accurate as of 9 March 2023

Source: UEFA.comPld = Matches played; W = Matches won; D = Matches drawn; L = Matches lost; GF = Goals for; GA = Goals against; GD = Goal Difference.

Team statistics

Season to season 

57 seasons in Primera División
25 seasons in Segunda División
7 seasons in Tercera División (as third tier)
Participations in UEFA Champions League: 1
Participations in UEFA Cup: 7
Participations in UEFA Cup Winners' Cup: 2

Recent La Liga seasons
Real Betis were relegated from La Liga in the 1999–2000 season, but were promoted back on their first attempt.

Players

Current squad

.

Reserve team

Out on loan

Retired numbers

26  Miki Roqué (deceased) (2009–12)

Player records

Most appearances

Most goals

Personnel

Board of Directors
President: Juan Carlos Ollero Pina
Vice-Presidents: José Miguel López Catalán, Ángel Haro García
board members: José Montoro Pizarro, Tomás Solano Franco, Ernesto Sanguino Gómez, José Maria Pagola Serra, Adrián Fernández Romero, María Victoria López Sánchez, Rafael Salas Garcia, Ramón Alarcón Rubiales, Cayetano García de la Borbolla Carrero
Ambassadors: Rafael Gordillo, Andrés Saavedra

Technical staff
Director of Football: Antonio Cordón
Assistant Director of Football: Alexis Trujillo
Head Scout: Vasiliki Pappa
Scouting: Jakob Friis-Hansen, Vlada Stošić, Carlos Vargas, Adrian Espárraga and Paulo Meneses
Technical Analysis Department: Tino Luis Cabrera (Head) and Jaime Quesada
Scouting U20s: Juan José Cañas (Head) and Pedro Morilla

Coaching staff

Manager: Manuel Pellegrini
Assistant manager: Rubén Cousillas
Fitness coach: Fran Soto
Fitness coach: Marcos Álvarez
Goalkeeper coach: Jon Pascua

Medical staff
Head of Medical Services: Tomás Calero
Physiotherapists: Fran Molano, José Manuel Pizarro, Manuel López, Manuel Alcantarilla
Nurse: José María Montiel

Honours

Official

League
La Liga
Winners (1): 1934–35
Segunda División
Winners (7): 1931–32, 1941–42, 1957–58, 1970–71, 1973–74, 2010–11, 2014–15
Tercera División
Winners (1): 1953–54

Cups
Copa del Rey
Winners (3): 1976–77, 2004–05, 2021–22
Copa Federacion de Espana
Winners (1): 1953–54

Others
Campeonato Regional Sur (defunct)
Winners (1): 1927–28

Individual

Pichichi Trophy
Hipólito Rincón (1982–83)

Zamora Trophy
Joaquín Urquiaga (1934–35)
Pedro Jaro (1994–95)

Coaches

Presidents

SEVILLA BALOMPIÉ
 Juan del Castillo Ochoa (1907–09)
 Alfonso del Castillo Ochoa (1909–10)
 José Gutiérrez Fernández (1910–11)
 Juan del Castillo Ochoa (1912)
 Herbert Richard Jones (1914)
BETIS FÚTBOL CLUB
 Eladio García de la Borbolla (1909)
 Manuel Gutiérrez Fernández (1910–11)
 Miguel Folgado (1913–14)
 Pedro Rodríguez de la Borbolla (1914)
REAL BETIS BALOMPIÉ
 Herbert Richard Jones (1914–15)
 Pedro Rodríguez de la Borbolla (1915–17)
 Roberto Vicente de Mata (1917–18)
 Eduardo Hernández Nalda (1918–19)
 Carlos Alarcón de la Lastra (1919–20)
 Jerónimo Pérez de Vargas (1920–21)
 Carlos Alarcón de la Lastra (1921–22)
 Gil Gómez Bajuelo (1922–23)
 Ramón Navarro (1923–25)
 Antonio Polo (1925–26)
 Ramón Cortecero (1926–27)
 Antonio de la Guardia (1927–28)
 Ignacio Sánchez Mejías (1928–29)
 Daniel Mezquita (1929–30)
 Camilo Romero Sánchez (1930)
 Adolfo Cuelliar Rodríguez (1930–31)

 Jose Ignacio Mantecón (1931–33)
 Antonio Moreno Sevillano (1933–39)
 Ramón Poll (1940–42)
 Alfonso Alarcón de Lastra (1942–43)
 Francisco Cantalapiedra (1943–44)
 Eduardo Benjumena (1944–45)
 Manuel Romero Puerto (1945–46)
 Filomeno de Aspe (1946–47)
 Pascual Aparicio (1947–50)
 Francisco de la Cerda (1950–52)
 Manuel Ruiz Rodríguez (1952–55)
 Benito Villamarín (1955–65)
 Avelino Villamarín (1965–66)
 Andrés Gaviño (1966–67)
 Julio de la Puerta (1967–69)
 José León (1969)
 José Núñez Naranjo (1969–79)
 Juan Manuel Mauduit (1979–83)
 Gerardo Martínez Retamero (1983–89)
 Hugo Galera (1989–92)
 José León (1992–96)
 Manuel Ruiz de Lopera (1996–2006)
 José León (2006–10)
 Rafael Gordillo (2010–11)
 Miguel Guillén Vallejo (2011–2014)
 Manuel Domínguez Platas (2014)
 Juan Carlos Ollero Pina (2014–2016)
 Ángel Haro García (2016-present)

Records

Club records
Best La Liga position: 1st (1934–35)
Worst La Liga position: 20th (1990–91, 2013–14)
Biggest home win: Betis 7–0 Zaragoza (1958–59)
Biggest away win: Cádiz 0–5 Betis (1977–78)
Biggest home defeat: Betis 0–5 Real Madrid (1960–61, 2013–14), Betis 0–5 Osasuna (2006–07), Betis 0–5 Barcelona (2017–18)
Biggest away defeat: Athletic Bilbao 9–1 Betis (1932–33)
Biggest comeback for: Betis – Barcelona: 0–2 to 3–2 (2007–08), Betis – Alavés: 0–2 to 3–2 (2020–21), Celta Vigo – Betis: 2–0 to 2–3 (2020–21)
Biggest comeback against: Betis – Espanyol: 2–0 to 2–5 (1999–2000)

Player records
Most appearances:  José Ramón Esnaola – 574
Most official appearances:  José Ramón Esnaola – 460
Most appearances in La Liga:  José Ramón Esnaola – 378
Most appearances in Copa del Rey:  José Ramón Esnaola – 64
Most appearances in European competitions:  Joaquín – 23
Top goalscorer (La Liga):  Hipólito Rincón – 78
Top goalscorer (overall): Rubén Castro – 148
Top goalscorer (European competitions):  Alfonso – 8
Most red cards:  Jaime Quesada – 7
First to play for Spain:  Simón Lecue – 1934
Most capped for Spain:  Rafael Gordillo – 75
Spanish internationals: 27

Stadium

Upon Real Betis' formation, the club played at the Campo del Huerto de Mariana. In 1909, Betis moved to the Campo del Prado de Santa Justa, moving to the Campo del Prado de San Sebastián, sharing the site with rivals Sevilla two years later. In 1918, Real Betis moved to the Campo del Patronato Obrero, with the first game at the ground coming against rivals Sevilla on 1 November 1918, resulting in a 5–1 loss for Real Betis. During the 1920s, the ground was redeveloped numerous times by club president Ignacio Sánchez Mejías. After the construction of the Estadio de la Exposición, the former name of Betis' current home, in 1929, Real Betis moved into the site officially in 1936, after playing a number of games at the stadium since its construction.

With a 60,720-seat capacity, the Estadio Benito Villamarín is the home ground of Real Betis. It was named Estadio Manuel Ruiz de Lopera during the 2000s after the club's owner, who decided to build a new stadium over the old one.

Despite much planning, the stadium's renovation plans were constantly postponed, and half of it remained unchanged. On 27 October 2010, it returned to its first denomination after a decision by the club's associates.

Colours

Evolution

In its initial years, Sevilla Balompié dressed in blue shirts with white shorts, which represented the infantry at the time. From late 1911, the team had adopted the shirts of Celtic, at that time vertical stripes of green and white, that were brought over from Glasgow by Manuel Asensio Ramos, who had studied in Scotland as a child. On 28 February 2017, on the 37th Andalusia Day, Real Betis wore Celtic-inspired hoops against Málaga CF.

When the team became Real Betis Balompié in 1914, various kits were used, including: yellow and black stripes; green T-shirts and a reversion to the blue top and white shorts uniform. By the end of the 1920s, Betis was once again sporting green and white stripes, around this time the Assembly of Ronda (1918) saw the Andalusian region formally adopt these colours, not being known how much the two are linked.

Since then, this remained Betis' shirt, despite several versions (including wider stripes).

Together with the basic green-and-white shirt, Betis has wore both black and green shorts in addition to white shorts.

References

External links

 Official website 
 Real Betis at La Liga 
 Real Betis at UEFA 

 
La Liga clubs
Football clubs in Andalusia
Copa del Rey winners
Organisations based in Spain with royal patronage
Association football clubs established in 1907
1907 establishments in Spain
Segunda División clubs